A hanger steak, also known as butcher's steak or hanging tenderloin, is a cut of beef steak prized for its flavor. This cut is taken from the plate, which is the upper belly of the animal. In the past it was among several cuts of beef sometimes known as "butcher's steak", because butchers would often keep it for themselves rather than offer it for sale. This is because the general populace believed this to be a crude cut of meat, although it is actually one of the most tender. 

Hanger steak resembles flank steak in texture and flavor.  It is a vaguely V-shaped pair of muscles with a long, inedible membrane running down the middle. The hanger steak is usually the most tender cut on an animal, aside from the tenderloin, which has no fat.

It is also sometimes incorrectly referred to as flap steak or flap meat, which is a distinctly different cut from the bottom sirloin in the rear quarter of the animal.

Description

Anatomically speaking, the hanger steak is the crura, or legs, of the diaphragm. The steak is said to "hang" from the diaphragm of the heifer or steer. The diaphragm is one muscle, commonly cut into two separate cuts of meat: the hanger steak, traditionally considered more flavorful, and the outer skirt steak, composed of tougher muscle from the dome of the diaphragm. The hanger is attached to the last rib and to the front of several of the lumbar vertebrae. The right side is larger and stronger than the left.

Use

Occasionally seen on American menus as a "bistro steak", hanger steak's U.S. meat-cutting classification is NAMP 140. Due to its limited quantity, is rarely marketed to consumers, with most hanger steak cuts being diverted to restaurants. 

The hanger steak has historically been more popular in Europe. In Britain it is referred to as "skirt", which is not to be confused with the American skirt steak.

See also
 Flank steak
 Skirt steak
 Flap steak

References 

 

Cuts of beef